Devil among the tailors (disambiguation)  or De'il amang the tailors (scots) may refer to:

 A Scottish traditional dance
 The  a Scottish fiddle tune, a reel played for the dance of the same name and also for the Eightsome Reel.
 A pub skittles game devil among the tailors
 A track on In/Casino/Out, the second full-length LP by American post-hardcore band "At the Drive-In"
  Devil-among-the-Tailors, a race horse who finished third in the Newmarket Sweepstakes in 1842
 A type of firework .